The Heart of the Hills is a 1916 American silent drama film directed by Richard Ridgely and starring Mabel Trunnelle, Conway Tearle and Raymond McKee.

Cast
 Mabel Trunnelle as Hester
 Conway Tearle as Redgell
 Bigelow Cooper as Sir Christopher Madgwick
 Raymond McKee as Eric 
 Marie La Corio as Edith
 Herbert Prior as Ali
 George A. Wright as Sani 
 Robert Conness as Karaji
 Edith Strickland as Natali
 Crauford Kent as McInnes
 Charles Sutton as Dr. Pettigrew
 Henry Leone as Darton

References

Bibliography
 John T. Soister, Henry Nicolella & Steve Joyce. American Silent Horror, Science Fiction and Fantasy Feature Films, 1913-1929. McFarland, 2014.

External links
 

1916 films
1916 drama films
1910s English-language films
American silent feature films
Silent American drama films
American black-and-white films
Films directed by Richard Ridgely
Edison Studios films
Films set in England
1910s American films